On to Evermore is the third studio album by American progressive rock band Glass Hammer, released on February 18, 1998.

Track listing

Personnel
 Glass Hammer
 Fred Schendel – lead and backing vocals, keyboards, guitars, sitar, mandolin, flute, drums
 Steve Babb – lead and backing vocals, keyboards, bass, percussion
 Walter Moore – lead and backing vocals, guitars, drums

 Additional musicians
 David Carter – guitars, backing vocals
 Tracy Cloud – backing vocals

External links 
 On to Evermore on the Glass Hammer Official website

References 

Glass Hammer albums
1998 albums